Aghbolagh (also Romanized as Āghbolāgh and Āgh Bolāgh) is a village in Ivughli Rural District, Ivughli District, Khoy County, West Azerbaijan Province, Iran. At the 2006 census, its population was 652, in 165 families.

References 

Populated places in Khoy County